Steven John Grieveson (born 14 December 1970) is a British serial killer known as the Sunderland Strangler, who murdered four teenage boys in a series of killings committed between 1990 and 1994 in Sunderland, England. Convicted of three counts of murder at Leeds Crown Court, Grieveson was handed three life sentences on 28 February 1996, with a recommendation that he serve a minimum of 35 years before the Home Secretary considers his eligibility for release.

In October 2013, Grieveson was convicted of the 1990 murder of 14-year-old Simon Martin at Newcastle Crown Court, and handed a fourth life sentence. He is incarcerated at HMP Full Sutton maximum security prison in the East Riding of Yorkshire, England.

Grieveson became known as the Sunderland Strangler due to the city in which he committed his murders, and his preferred murder method of ligature strangulation.

Murders and trial 
On 26 November 1993, Grieveson murdered 18-year-old Thomas Kelly in an abandoned allotment shed in Fulwell, Sunderland. His body was set on fire. On 4 February 1994, he murdered 15-year-old David Hanson in Roker Terrace, before finally murdering 15-year-old David Grieff on 25 February 1994 in an abandoned Fulwell allotment just 50 yards from where he had killed Thomas Kelly three months earlier. All three victims were pupils or former pupils of Monkwearmouth Academy, and suspicion among both law enforcement and the staff and fellow pupils at this school was that all three victims had known their killer—who may have been a present or former student of Monkwearmouth Academy himself. Grieveson was a pupil primarily at Hylton Red House School.

Grieveson was initially arrested on 11 March, charged with an attempted burglary at the Roker Terrace household where the charred body of David Hanson had previously been found. Following an extensive investigation, Grieveson was charged with the three murders in November 1995, and faced a six-week trial in 1996 where he was handed three life sentences for murder. He was ordered to serve a minimum of 35 years in prison.

It was ascertained at this first trial, held at Leeds Crown Court, that Grieveson murdered the three boys in order to conceal evidence of his homosexuality. When asked their personal feelings towards Steven Grieveson following his conviction, the father of Thomas Kelly stated: "[It is] a great relief this monster is off the streets so no other family will have to go through what we faced."

Fourth murder conviction
In November 2000, Grieveson, serving his three life sentences at Full Sutton Prison, was arrested and questioned over the May 1990 murder of 14-year-old Simon Martin, who was murdered in Gilside House, Roker.

In June 2004, Grieveson wrote a letter to the Victim Liaison Services in which he admitted murdering the three victims killed in 1993 and 1994, but in which he omitted his culpability in the murder of Simon Martin. As such, he was not charged with Martin's murder at the time. On 22 November 2012, however, Grieveson was charged with the murder of Simon Martin, and on 11 February 2013, he admitted being responsible for Martin's death, but denied that this particular murder had been premeditated. He was convicted of Simon Martin's murder on 24 October 2013 following a trial at Newcastle Crown Court.

Discounted link to other murder
On 20 February 2014, Grieveson was also arrested on suspicion of the 1992 murder of a seven-year-old girl named Nikki Allan, who had been found stabbed to death in a disused warehouse in October 1992. Two years after her death a neighbour, who had confessed to the killing, was acquitted after police were found to have used "oppressive methods" in their questioning. Although Allan was female and had been stabbed to death, the extensive blunt force trauma injuries inflicted to her head had been similar to those Grieveson had inflicted on Simon Martin in 1990. Grieveson was questioned as to his potential involvement, although detectives later stated he was to face no further current action in relation to their ongoing enquiries into Allan's murder. In 2017, police announced they had isolated a full DNA profile of the killer from previous samples, leading to the re-arrest in 2019 of a previous suspect (not Grieveson).

See also

 Child sexual abuse
 Crime in the United Kingdom
 List of serial killers in the United Kingdom
 List of serial killers by number of victims

References

Cited works and further reading
 Baker, Jeanette (1996). Triple Horror in Sunderland. Master Detective. December 1996 issue. 
 Hall, Steve; Winlow, Simon (2012). New Directions in Criminological Theory. Routledge. pp. 230–231.

External links
 1996 Independent news article detailing Grieveson's initial murder convictions at Leeds Crown Court
 Contemporary BBC news article detailing Grieveson's 2013 conviction for the murder of Simon Martin
 ITV News footage of Grieveson's fourth murder conviction, as broadcast 24 October 2013

1970 births
1990 murders in the United Kingdom
1993 murders in the United Kingdom
1994 murders in the United Kingdom
1990s trials
2010s trials
20th-century English criminals
20th-century English LGBT people
Criminals from Tyne and Wear
English male criminals
English murderers of children
English people convicted of murder
English prisoners sentenced to life imprisonment
English serial killers
English LGBT people
Living people
Male serial killers
Murder trials
People convicted of murder by England and Wales
People from Sunderland
Prisoners sentenced to life imprisonment by England and Wales
Trials in England
Violence against men in the United Kingdom